Kim Keat Single Member Constituency was a constituency in Singapore. It used to exist from 1968 to 1988 as Kim Keat Constituency and was renamed as Kim Keat Single Member Constituency (SMC) as part of Singapore's political reforms. The SMC was merged into Toa Payoh Group Representation Constituency in 1991. Ong Teng Cheong was the only Member of Parliament throughout its existence.

Member of Parliament

Elections

Elections in 1970s

Elections in 1980s

References

Singaporean electoral divisions
Toa Payoh